The Beloved is a 1940 Soviet drama film directed by Ivan Pyryev.

Plot 
Successful turner-multiplayer of one car factory Vasily, having received a new home, tries to persuade his girlfriend to move to him. It would seem all right, but on the first day of their life together they quarrel, as a result of which Varya returns to her home. Soon she has a baby. Her family does everything possible to reconcile the couple.

Starring 
 Marina Ladynina as Varya Lugina
 Vsevolod Sanaev as Vasiliy Dobryakov
 Leonid Kmit as Viktor Simakov
 Aleksandr Zrazhevsky as Semyon Dementevich
 Mariya Yarotskaya as Evdikiya Petrovna
 Faina Ranevskaya as Marya Ivanovna
 Ivan Lobyzovskiy as Kostya Zaytsev (as I. Lobyzovskiy)
 Nikolai Nikitich as Judge
 Sergei Antimonov as Doorman in Maternity Home (uncredited)
 Pyotr Glebov as Spectator in the stands (uncredited)

References

External links 

1940 films
1940s Russian-language films
Soviet black-and-white films
Soviet drama films
1940 drama films